Cressida Granger is a British entrepreneur. She is the owner and managing director of Mathmos, the lighting company founded by Edward Craven Walker, inventor of the lava lamp.

Career
Granger took over Mathmos in 1989  and won  two Queens Awards for Export.

After buying out her business partner David Mulley in 1998 and created with Mathmos Design Studio new ambient lighting products both in house and in collaboration with external designers. 

Granger is a History of Art Graduate (BA University of Manchester) and was a vintage design dealer specialising in 1960s and early 1970s design.

Creative industry activities
Granger was part of the Government Innovation Review Committee with James Dyson and Terrance Conran in 2003.
She has sat on selection and judging panels for various design bodies including 100% Light, D&AD Awards and Design Nation Awards.
Granger lectures occasionally at Ravensbourne Design College on entrepreneurship in design businesses.
Granger is a director of the Made in Britain (campaign), a campaign seeking to establish a marque to identify British made goods.

Business and marketing awards
Queens Awards for Export 2000 and 1997
Veuve Cliquot Woman of the Year Finalist 1999
Fast Track 100 (3rd fastest growing manufacturer 1999)
Yell Award best commercial website 1997
Design Week Best Consumer website 1998

Design awards
Red Dot Awards: 2006 (Grito), 2002 (Tumbler), 2001 (Bubble)
Gift Magazine Design Homewares winner 2005 (Airswitch tc)
Design Week commendations: 2004 (Airswitch Az), 2003 (Aduki), 2002 (Tumbler), 2001 (Fluidium)
House and Garden best consumer product 2004. (Airswitch Az)
Form 2001 Award (Tumbler) 
Industrial Design Excellence Award (IDEA) 2001 (Bubble)
D&AD commendation 2001 (Bubble)
Light Magazine Decorative Lighting Award 2001 (Bubble)
FX Magazine finalist best lighting product 2000 (Fluidium)

References

 How I Beat The Odds: Cressida Granger of lava lamp pioneer Mathmos, Management Today, October 2013
 The Secret History Of: The Lava lamp  The Independent
 Dyson to advise government BBC
 My new media - The Guardian 
 The Times
 Modern retro - Design Week
 British manufacturing Renaissance - ICON Magazine
 Mathmos' Story
 Lava lamp creators mark 50 years of 1960s icon, BBC News, Aug 2013
 Far out, man: world’s largest lava lamp on show at the South Bank, Time Out, September 11, 2013
 Lava Lamp’s 50 Years of Gooey Light, Wired, September 2013
 Lava lamp creators mark 50 years of 1960s icon, ITV, September 2013
  The Lava Lamp: 1960s Psychedelic Icon Celebrates Its 50th Anniversary, Artlyst Aug 2013
 Lava lamps flow back into fashion, The Times, September 2013
 Made in Britain Campaign appoints CEO to push British manufacturers further, Business Matters,  April 22, 2015

Year of birth missing (living people)
Living people
British businesspeople